Rodiles is one of 28 parishes (administrative divisions) in the municipality of Grado, within the province and autonomous community of Asturias, in northern Spain. 

The population is 76 (INE 2009).

Villages and hamlets include:  Arellanes, Rodiles, San Pedro and Villagarcía.

References  

Parishes in Grado